List of rivers in the Federal District of Brazil.

The list is arranged by drainage basin, with respective tributaries indented under each larger stream's name and ordered from downstream to upstream.

By Drainage Basin

Tocantins Basin 

 Tocantins River  (Tocantins, Goiás)
 Maranhão River
 Do Sal River
 Das Palmas River
 Das Salinas River

São Francisco Basin 
 São Francisco River (Bahia, Minas Gerais)
 Paracatu River (Minas Gerais)
 Preto River
 São Bernardo River
 Jardim River

Paraná Basin 

 Paraná River (Argentina, Paraná, Mato Grosso do Sul)
 Paranaíba River (Goiás)
 Corumbá River (Goiás)
 São Bartolomeu River
 Paranoá River
 Lake Paranoá
 Sobradinho Creek
 Pipiripau River
 Ponte Alta River
 Descoberto River
 Melchior River
 Rodeador River
 São Marcos River (Goiás)
 Samambaia River

Alphabetically 

 Descoberto River
 Jardim River
 Maranhão River
 Melchior River
 Das Palmas River
 Paranoá River
 Pipiripau River
 Ponte Alta River
 Preto River
 Rodeador River
 Do Sal River
 Das Salinas River
 Samambaia River
 São Bartolomeu River
 São Bernardo River
 Sobradinho Creek

References
 Map from Ministry of Transport

Federal